Alex Freitas (born 14 November 1988) is a Brazilian footballer who plays as a defender for the VSI Tampa Bay FC in the USL Pro.

Career
Freitas made his debut for VSI Tampa Bay FC of the USL Pro, the third-tier of soccer in the United States, on 30 March 2013 against Phoenix FC in which he came on in the 53rd minute as Tampa Bay lost the match, 1–0.

Career statistics

Club
Statistics accurate as of 2 April 2013

References

External links 
 VSI Tampa Bay Profile

1988 births
Living people
USL Championship players
Association football midfielders
Expatriate soccer players in the United States
Brazilian footballers
VSI Tampa Bay FC players